Pultenaea scabra, commonly known as rough bush-pea, is a species of flowering plant in the family Fabaceae and is endemic to south-eastern continental Australia. It is an erect or spreading shrub with hairy stems, heart-shaped leaves with the narrower end towards the base, and yellow and red, pea-like flowers.

Description
The edges of the leaves curve down or are rolled under and there is a small point on the end.

Taxonomy
Pultenaea scabra was first formally described in 1811 by Robert Brown in Hortus Kewensis. The specific epithet (scabra) means "rough".

Distribution and habitat
Rough bush-pea grows in heathland and forest south of Rylstone in New South Wales, in southern Victoria, mainly south and east of the Great Dividing Range, and in the far south-east of South Australia.

References

Fabales of Australia
Flora of New South Wales
Flora of South Australia
Flora of Victoria (Australia)
scabra
Plants described in 1811
Taxa named by Robert Brown (botanist, born 1773)